Sir Thomas Powell, 1st Baronet (c. 1665 – 22 August 1720), of Broadway, Laugharne, Carmarthenshire and Coldbrook Park, Abergavenny, Monmouthshire, was a Welsh lawyer and politician.

He was the only son of the Carmarthenshire judge Sir John Powell, of Pentre Meyrick, Llanwrda and Broadway and was educated at St Catharine's College, Cambridge. He studied law at the Middle Temple from 1681, was called to the Bar in 1687 and made reader in 1702.

He became recorder of Oswestry in 1698 and attorney-general on the Carmarthen circuit from 1695 to 1715. He was created a baronet in 1698.

He was a Member (MP) of the Parliament of England for Monmouth Boroughs from 1705 to 1708. In the Parliament of Great Britain he was MP for Carmarthenshire from 1710 to 1715.

He married twice; firstly Elizabeth, daughter of Thomas Mansel of Briton Ferry, Glamorgan,  and secondly Judith, the daughter and heiress of Sir James Herbert, of Coldbrook Park. He left a son, who died a year after himself, and several daughters.

References

1665 births
1720 deaths
People from Abergavenny
People from Carmarthenshire
Alumni of St Catharine's College, Cambridge
Members of the Middle Temple
Members of the Parliament of Great Britain for Welsh constituencies
Baronets in the Baronetage of England
English MPs 1705–1707
British MPs 1707–1708
British MPs 1710–1713
British MPs 1713–1715